The Manila Challenger (also known as the Philippine Open) was a tennis tournament held in Manila, Philippines 2016. The event is part of the ATP Challenger Tour and is played on outdoor hard courts. The inaugural tournament of the Manila Challenger was held at the newly refurbished Rizal Memorial Tennis Center in Manila on January 18–24, 2016 with local players and experienced ATP-ranked tennis players vying for the top prize of $75,000 dollars.

Results

Singles

Doubles

References

External links 

ATP Challenger Tour
Hard court tennis tournaments
Tennis tournaments in the Philippines